Stumptown may refer to several unincorporated communities in the U.S. state of Virginia:

 Stumptown, Loudoun County, Virginia
 Stumptown, Northampton County, Virginia